VeraSun Energy Corporation was a leading producer of renewable fuel. Founded in 2001, the company at one time had a fleet of 16 production facilities in eight states, of which one was still under construction. The company also had begun construction at its Aurora, South Dakota facility to extract oil from dried distillers grains, a co-product of the ethanol process, for use in biodiesel production.

VeraSun marketed E85, a blend of 85 percent ethanol and 15 percent gasoline for use in Flexible fuel vehicles (FFVs), directly to fuel retailers under the brand VE85. VeraSun Energy at one time had approximately 150 VE85 retail locations under contract in more than fifteen states and Washington, D.C.

History
VeraSun Energy was founded in 2001 with the goal of providing a renewable, home-grown energy source while boosting domestic rural economy and creating a future that includes renewable energy to help benefit the environment and reduce the nation's demand for foreign oil.

The company has been credited for a number of "industry firsts" – the first -per-year dry-grind production facility, the country's first branded E85, VE85; the first ethanol producer to form strategic alliances with Ford Motor Company, General Motors, Enterprise Rent-A-Car and Kroger to increase awareness and availability of E85, and the first company to place an E85 retail station in the Washington D.C. metro area.

VeraSun began producing ethanol in December 2003 when its Aurora, S.D., production facility came on-line. Not stopping with two facilities, VeraSun began other greenfield site developments in Iowa at Charles City and Hartley, in addition to a third location in Welcome, Minnesota. A fourth greenfield location was under development and halted prior to construction in Reynolds, Indiana – also referred to as BioTown USA. VeraSun Charles City began operation in April 2007, three months ahead of schedule.

On June 14, 2006, VeraSun became the first "pure play" ethanol producer to take its stock public when it listed on the New York Stock Exchange (NYSE). The public listing was the first of several major announcements for the company over the next 18 months.

The merger closed on April 1, 2008 and VeraSun was positioned as the largest ethanol producer in the United States with plants located in eight different states.

Less than a year later, VeraSun filed for bankruptcy.

Biorefinery locations
VeraSun Energy had a fleet of 16 production facilities in eight states. They are listed below in alphabetical order.

Aurora, South Dakota
Start-Up: December 2003

Bloomingburg, Ohio
Start-Up: March 2008

Central City, Nebraska
Start-Up: April 2004

Charles City, Iowa
Start-Up: April 2007

Dyersville, Iowa
Start-Up: September 2008

Fort Dodge, Iowa
Start-Up: October 2005

Hankinson, North Dakota
Start-Up: July 2008

Hartley, Iowa
Start-Up: August 2008

Janesville, Minnesota
Projected Start-Up: Q4 2008

Linden, Indiana
Start-Up: August 2007

Marion, South Dakota
Start-Up: February 2008

Ord, Nebraska
Start-Up: May 2007

Welcome, Minnesota
Construction Complete: June 2008

Woodbury, Michigan
Start-Up: September 2006
The Woodbury plant was sold in May, 2009 to Carbon Green LLC.

Bankruptcy
As of October 31, 2008, VeraSun and twenty-four of its subsidiaries have filed for Chapter 11 bankruptcy protection to enhance liquidity while it reorganizes. The Sioux Falls-based company says the move was voluntary in order to maintain business as usual. South Dakota Senator John Thune says he is hopeful VeraSun Energy will emerge a stronger company after the chapter 11 filing.

VeraSun's financial difficulties were the result of the company hedging its corn consumption with an OTC derivative known as an accumulator. The derivative contract works as such: VeraSun locks in their procurement of corn at a discount to current market prices. However, if the market moves below this discounted level then VeraSun was required to take in twice as much as it was normally contracted to. This results in VeraSun taking twice as much grain as they need at a higher price than if they bought on the open market. More over, these accumulators typically have a stipulation where if the price of corn were to rise too high relative to the discounted level then the contract would knock out and no longer be in effect. Every week these conditions are checked and the appropriate amount of corn is purchased by VeraSun at the appropriate price. What happened to Verasun was that the price of corn fell drastically causing them to buy twice as much corn as they need at what was then a relatively high price. On top of this the price of ethanol fell as well, this caused their crushing margin to go negative.

VeraSun ended up selling seven of the plants to Valero Energy Corporation, and the rest to other companies in 2009.

References

External links
 VeraSun Energy Corp.
 VE85

Alcohol fuel producers
Companies based in Sioux Falls, South Dakota
Defunct companies based in South Dakota
Energy companies of the United States
Companies formerly listed on the New York Stock Exchange
Companies that filed for Chapter 11 bankruptcy in 2008
2001 establishments in South Dakota
2009 disestablishments in South Dakota